Arthur Merric Boyd (19 March 1862 – 30 July 1940) was an Australian painter. He and his wife Emma Minnie (née à Beckett) established a lifestyle of being artists which many generations followed to create the popular image of the Boyd family.

Biography
Boyd was born in Opoho, Dunedin, New Zealand, son of Captain John Theodore Thomas Boyd, formerly of County Mayo, Ireland, and his wife Lucy Charlotte, daughter of Dr Robert Martin of Heidelberg, Victoria. The Boyds moved to Australia in the mid-1870s, and on 14 January 1886 Boyd married Emma Minnie à Beckett, also an artist and known as Minnie, daughter of the Hon. W. A. C. à Beckett of Melbourne. In 1890 they moved to England and lived for a time at Penleigh House, Westbury, Wiltshire, and in 1891 husband and wife each had a picture in the Royal Academy exhibition.

Boyd then travelled and painted a good deal on the continent of Europe, and returned to Australia about the end of 1893, where he lived mostly in Sandringham and other suburbs of Melbourne for the rest of his life. He occasionally sent good work to the exhibitions of the Victorian Artists' Society, but never mixed much in the artistic life of his time.

Minnie Boyd died at Melbourne on 13 September 1936 at Sandringham. Arthur Merric Boyd died on the property of his son, Merric, at Murrumbeena on 30 July 1940. Each is represented by a picture in the National Gallery of Victoria in Melbourne. They left three sons, Theodore Penleigh Boyd (1890–1923), Martin à Beckett Boyd (1893–1972), a popular writer of fiction firstly under the name 'Martin Mills' and then his own, and Merric (1888–1959), a potter, and a daughter Helen à Beckett Boyd, a painter.

Selected paintings

References

Further reading

External links

Artwork by Arthur Boyd in the collection of the Museum of New Zealand Te Papa Tongarewa

Arthur Merric
1862 births
1940 deaths
19th-century New Zealand male artists
19th-century Australian painters
19th-century Australian male artists
20th-century Australian painters
20th-century Australian male artists
New Zealand emigrants to Australia
Australian male painters
19th-century New Zealand painters